Kappiri Thuruthu is a 2016 Indian Malayalam-language romantic drama musical film written and directed by debutant Saheer Ali. The film features Adil Ibrahim, Pearle Maaney and Siddique in the lead roles. It is based on the past era and events happened at Kochi when it was under the rule of Dutch and then British. It also tells the story of H. Mehaboob, who was the beloved singer of Kochi. The film is produced by Cimofi productions pvt ltd and Ahamed Palapparambil under the banner of 20-20 Movie International. It was released on 9 December 2016. Expertouch Media which is a leading Ad Film Agency in Chennai, Kerala, Delhi and Bangalore offer Promotions to this Film

Cast 
 Adil Ibrahim as Samovar Sadhasivan
 Pearle Maaney as Yami
 Siddique as Choonda Masthan
 Lal as Kadalakka Ustad
 Indrans
 Surabhi Lakshmi as Rukhiya
 Hareesh Perumanna as Thapala Pookunju
 S.P.Sreekumar as Timing Panchi
 Shivaji Guruvayoor
 Sunil Sukhada
 Rajesh Sharma as Kannan Anthramankutty
 Ramesh Narayan
 Pauly Valsan
 P.M.Abu
 Babu Pallassery
 K.B Venu

Soundtrack 
The soundtrack album for the film was composed by Rafeeq Yusaf and the background score was scored by Madhu Paul. Mirza Ghalib, Vayalar Ramavarma, Nelson Fernandez, KH Sulaiman Master and Meppalli Balan penned the lyrics. The audio was released on 17 October 2016, on the label of Manorama Music.

Critical reception 
Deepthi Sreenivasan for Deccan Chronicle rated the film 2.5 out of 5 and commented, "The movie begins to take a turn when local goons eye Sadhu's wife which ends in a public brawl. The last time Malayalis had a similar taste of Kochi's cultural treasure trove was in the Dileep starrer Gramophone. Debutant Saheer Ali obviously had too much information on his hands and was trying to include as many things as he can with a love story running parallel to it. His effort was earnest but the film could have done without so much detailing. Adil Ibrahim shines as Sadhu and Pearle compliments perfectly". CinemaDaddy stated, "The way the plot is presented the story and the elements like love, music, agony and the fight for survival are mixed up and it was just beautiful and it was like watching a part of the history of Kochi unfolding before our eyes. The selection of events portrayed in the movie also deserves kudos and the director was in control over the proceedings right from the start. Kappiri Thuruthu keeps a tight leash throughout and leaves a strong impression in the mind".

References

External links 
 
 

2010s Malayalam-language films